Entremont may refer to:
Entremont, Haute-Savoie, a municipality of the Haute-Savoie département in France
Entremont (district), a district of the canton of Valais in Switzerland and was a canton of the former Simplon département of the French Empire
Entremont (oppidum), a Gaulish oppidum near Aix-en-Provence in southern Gaul, chief town of the Salyes

Philippe Entremont (born 1934), French pianist and conductor